Ramón Ibarra Rivera (born January 26, 1981), better known by his ring name Volador Jr., is a Mexican luchador (or professional wrestler), who works for Consejo Mundial de Lucha Libre (CMLL). He portrays a técnico ("good guy") wrestling character and is considered one of the top level técnicos in the promotion. He is the son of Super Parka, and his ring name refers to his father's previous gimmick, Volador. Ibarra is the nephew of the original La Parka, the cousin of El Hijo de L.A. Park and the uncle of Flyer; he is also related to a number of other luchadors in the Ibarra family.

Ibarra has also worked outside his native Mexico on multiple occasions, with his highest profile work being for Total Nonstop Action Wrestling (TNA) in the United States, and New Japan Pro-Wrestling (NJPW) in Japan. Volador Jr. originally worked under a mask but was forced to unmask when he lost his mask to long time friend turned rival, La Sombra, in September 2013.

Over the years he has held a number of CMLL championships including the CMLL World Tag Team Championship, the CMLL World Trios Championship, the Mexican National Light Heavyweight Championship, Mexican National Trios Championship, the NWA World Historic Middleweight Championship and the NWA World Historic Welterweight Championship. He has won CMLL's Torneo Gran Alternativa, Leyenda de Plata and Torneo Nacional de Parejas Increibles tournaments.

Professional wrestling career
Volador Jr. made his professional wrestling debut in 1999 after training with his father, the original Volador. Initially he worked on the independent circuit around his native Coahuila.

Consejo Mundial de Lucha Libre (2001–present)

On August 14, 2001, Volador Jr. competed in the annual Torneo Gran Alternativa teaming with Atlantis. The team was eliminated in the semifinals by Black Warrior and Sangre Azteca after having defeated Máscara Año 2000 and Enemigo Publico in the first round. Volador Jr. participated in a tournament to determine the first ever CMLL World Super Lightweight Champion, but was defeated in the first round to Rocky Romero. On December 5, 2003, he, El Felino and Safari won the vacant Mexican National Trios Championship by defeating the team of Alan Stone, Super Crazy and Zumbido in a tournament final. On August 20, 2004, he competed in the Torneo Gran Alternativa once again teaming with Atlantis and once again but they were eliminated in the semifinals, defeated by eventual tournament winners El Hijo del Santo and Místico. In the first round the team had defeated Perro Aguayo, Jr. and Sangre Azteca. Volador Jr., El Felino and Safari lost the Mexican National Trios Championship on March 25, 2005, to Pandilla Guerrera (Doctor X, Nitro and Sangre Azteca). On June 2, 2006, he competed in the Torneo Gran Alternativa, teaming with Dos Caras, Jr. but were eliminated in the first by Último Guerrero and Nitro. On August 13, 2007, Volador teamed up with El Sagrado and La Sombra to win the Mexican National Trios Championship for the second time.

On January 16, 2009, La Sombra and Volador Jr., dubbed "Super Sky Team", defeated Averno and Mephisto to win the CMLL World Tag Team Championship. Super Sky Team's status as double champions ended on February 3, 2009, when Volador Jr., El Sagrado and La Sombra lost the Mexican Trios Championship to Poder Mexica (Sangre Azteca, Black Warrior and Dragón Rojo, Jr.). Following the title loss, Volador Jr. and La Sombra focused on working as a team, defended their tag team titles eight times through 2009 and 2010. Their teamwork resulted in them being voted the "CMLL Tag Team of the year" for 2009 by the fans of CMLL. Volador Jr. was also voted "Most popular wrestler of the year" in the same poll.

On January 22, 2010, Volador Jr. teamed up with El Terrible to participate in CMLL's "Torneo Nacional de Pareja Increíbles" ("National Amazing Pairs tournament"), a tournament where CMLL teams up a Tecnico (Volador Jr.) and a Rudo (El Terrible) for a tournament. In the second round of the tournament the team faced Averno and Místico. Initially Místico wrestle as the tecnico he has been for years, but during the match Místico's attitude seemingly changed as he began attacking Volador Jr., someone he had teamed with for years. Místico even went so far as to ripping up Volador's mask, a rudo move, and won the match after an illegal low blow to Volador Jr. After the match Místico took the microphone and claimed that "all was fair in war and defending Mexico City", a comment that drew many boos from the crowd. The two met in the main event of an Arena México show on February 5, 2010, and this time Místico was clearly a Rúdo, tearing so viciously at Volador's mask that a new mask had to be brought to the ring during falls. In the second fall Místico pulled his mask off and threw it to Volador Jr. in an attempt to get Volador Jr. disqualified. The end came when Volador Jr. reversed Místico's La Mística and won by applying the same move to Místico. Following the match Místico angrily proclaimed “¡Yo soy la máxima figura de la lucha libre!”. ("I am the greatest figure in wrestling"). On February 12, 2010, Místico lost the Mexican National Light Heavyweight Championship to Volador Jr. two falls to one. On the February 26 CMLL Super Viernes show it was announced that Místico, Volador Jr., La Sombra and El Felino would face off in a four-way Lucha de Apuesta match as the main event of the 2010 Homenaje a Dos Leyendas. La Sombra was the first man pinned at Dos Leyendas and El Felino was the second, forcing the two to put their masks on the line. After a long match La Sombra pinned El Felino. After the match he unmasked and announced that his real name was Jorge Luis Casas Ruiz. Following Dos Leyendas Místico announced that he was done being a rúdo and returned to the técnico side, although Volador Jr. remained suspicious of Místico. The storyline between the two cooled off for a bit, but in late May 2010, tension resumed as Místico and Volador Jr. faced off once again at the Mexican Light Heavyweight Championship, with Volador Jr. retaining the belt. At the 2010 Sin Salida the two were on opposite sides of a Relevos incredibles, Místico teamed with Máscara Dorada and Mr. Águila while Volador Jr. teamed with Averno and Negro Casas. Averno came to the ring wearing the same combined Averno/Místico mask he had worn for the Parejas Incredibles tournament and tried to convince Místico to join the rúdo side, only to turn around and reveal that both he and Volador Jr. were wearing a combined Averno/Volador Jr. mask underneath. Volador Jr. worked as a rúdo throughout the match, losing the match for his team when he tried to cheat but was caught by the referee. On July 12, 2010, at the Promociones Gutiérrez 1st Anniversary Show, Volador Jr. participated in a match where 10 men put their mask on the line in a match that featured five pareja incredibles teams, with the losing team being forced to wrestle each other with their mask on the line. His partner in the match was El Alebrije, facing off against the teams of Atlantis and Olímpico, Místico and El Oriental, Histeria and La Sombra, and Último Guerrero and Averno. Volador Jr. and El Alebrije were the second team to escape the match. In the end Místico defeated El Oriental to unmask him. After teasing a rudo turn for over a month, Volador Jr. and La Sombra lost the CMLL World Tag Team Championship to the Los Invasores team of Mr. Águila and Héctor Garza on July 23, 2010 without any signs of dissension between the two. During a later show Volador Jr. finally turned rudo when he attacked La Sombra, tore his former partner's mask off and beat him up. During the 2010 Universal Championship tournament, Volador Jr. defeated Valiente in the first round. In the second round Volador Jr. faced La Máscara and cemented his status as a rudo when he was disqualified for excessive violence against La Máscara. He kept attacking La Máscara after the match ended, leaving La Máscara an easy victim for his next round opponent, Jushin Thunder Liger.

Following the Super Viernes on August 13, 2010, where he attacked La Máscara, Volador Jr. began being booked as rudo, although the on again, off again feud with Místico was put to the side in favor of Volador Jr. against La Sombra. The feud between the two led both wrestlers to be booked in the main event of the CMLL 77th Anniversary Show, a 14-man steel cage Lucha de Apuesta, mask vs. mask match. Volador Jr. was the 10th man to leave the steel cage, keeping his mask safe. The match came down to La Sombra pinning Olímpico to unmask him. On September 17, Volador Jr. picked up one of the biggest wins in his CMLL career, defeating Místico in the finals of a tournament to win the Copa Bicentenario. On October 5, 2010, Volador Jr. lost the Mexican National Light Heavyweight Championship to La Máscara, ending his reign at 236 days. After losing the title, Volador Jr. spent several months not doing anything significant in CMLL until he took over the Los Invasores stable in July 2011, when its leader Héctor Garza turned tecnico. On September 18, Volador Jr. unsuccessfully challenged former partner La Sombra for the NWA World Historic Welterweight Championship, in a match that received rave reviews. Two days later, Volador Jr. led Olímpico and Psicosis II of Los Invasores to the Mexican National Trios Championship, when they defeated the trio of Ángel de Oro, Diamante and Rush. Volador Jr. continued his successful run on September 23 by defeating eleven other men in a torneo cibernetico to advance to the finals of the 2011 Leyenda de Plata. On October 7, Volador Jr. defeated Jushin Thunder Liger to win the tournament. Los Invasores lost the Mexican National Trios Championship to Atlantis, Delta and Guerrero Maya, Jr. on December 16, 2011. On February 14, 2012, Volador Jr. defeated La Máscara to win the NWA World Historic Middleweight Championship for the first time. On March 30, Volador Jr. lost the title to New Japan Pro-Wrestling (NJPW) representative Prince Devitt.

On June 20, 2012, Volador Jr. formed the Los Depredadores del Aire ("The Predators of the Air") group alongside Black Warrior and Mr. Águila. Two days later, Los Depredadores del Aire defeated Los Reyes de la Atlantida (Atlantis, Delta and Guerrero Maya Jr.) to win the Mexican National Trios Championship. For July 29, Volador Jr. traveled to Tokyo, Japan, in an attempt to regain the NWA World Historic Middleweight Championship from Prince Devitt, but would eventually fail in his title challenge. The following month, Volador Jr. started a rivalry with Mr. Niebla, for which he was positioned as a tecnico even though still being a part of rudo stable Los Invasores. On October 30, Los Depredadores del Aire lost the Mexican National Trios Championship back to Los Reyes de la Atlantida. On January 22, 2013, Volador Jr. survived a torneo cibernetico to advance to a final match for the vacant CMLL World Light Heavyweight Championship against the other survivor, Rey Escorpión. On January 29, Volador Jr. was defeated in the finals of the tournament by Escorpión. Following their clash over the Reyes del Aire trophy, Volador Jr. and La Sombra were teamed up for the 2013 Torneo Nacional de Parejas Increibles tournament, the same tournament that in 2010 was the impetus for Volador Jr.'s rudo turn. The rivals put their issues aside for the tournament defeating the teams of Guerrero Maya Jr. and Negro Casas, La Máscara and Averno and finally Shocker and Mr. Niebla to qualify for the finals of the tournament. On March 15, 2013, at the 2013 Homenaje a Dos Leyendas show, Volador Jr. and La Sombra defeated Altantis and Último Guerrero to win the Torneo Nacional de Parejas Increibles. The truce between La Sombra and Volador Jr. that allowed them to win the tag team tournament only lasted until the next time the two rivals were in the same ring. On Sunday, February 17, 2013, La Sombra teamed up with Marco Corleone and Místico La Nueva Era against Volador Jr., Euforia and Último Guerrero. During the match Volador Jr. attacked both La Sombra and the referee, causing a disqualification before leaving the ring and his confused partners behind. On September 13 at CMLL's 80th Anniversary Show, Volador Jr. and La Sombra defeated Atlantis and Último Guerrero in a Relevos Suicidas match and thus advanced to a Mask vs. Mask Lucha de Apuestas against each other. In the end, Volador Jr. was defeated and forced to unmask and reveal his real name.

On November 19, Volador Jr. defeated Máscara Dorada to win the NWA World Historic Welterweight Championship. Three days later, Volador Jr. began showing signs of a tecnico turn by shaking hands with Místico and trying to save him from Los Guerreros Laguneros, before walking out on his Los Invasores partners. His turn was finalized on November 29, when Los Invasores attacked him following a torneo cibernetico between Los Invasores and representatives of CMLL. On June 6, 2014, Volador Jr. lost the NWA World Historic Welterweight Championship to La Sombra in a match also contested for the NWA World Historic Middleweight Championship. The loss came as a result of outside interference from La Máscara and Rush. Volador Jr. regained the title from La Sombra on August 1 at El Juicio Final. In early 2015, Volador Jr. came together with Místico and Valiente to form a new Sky Team. On February 13, Sky Team defeated Los Guerreros Laguneros (Euforia, Niebla Roja and Último Guerrero) to win the CMLL World Trios Championship. On April 5, 2016, Volador Jr. and rookie Esfinge defeated Fujin and Rey Escorpión to win the 2016 Gran Alternativa tournament. On July 1, Volador Jr. won the 2016 International Gran Prix, scoring the last elimination over Tama Tonga. On October 20, 2017, Volador defeated Carístico to win the 2017 Leyenda de Plata. On November 3, Volador Jr. turned on Carístico, attacking him with help from Rush, who afterwards stated that Volador Jr. had everything it took to join Los Ingobernables. At Homenaje a Dos Leyendas 2018, Volador and Valiente defeated El Terrible and Rey Bucanero to win the CMLL World Tag Team Championship.

Total Nonstop Action Wrestling (2008)
In 2008, Volador Jr. was given an opportunity to travel to the United States and compete for the Florida-based Total Nonstop Action Wrestling (TNA) as part of their 2008 World X Cup tournament. TNA decided to simply drop the "Junior" part of his name and promote him as "Volador". He was part of Team Mexico, working with Rey Bucanero, Último Guerrero and Averno, with TNA ignoring the fact that Volador Jr. had been rivals with all three wrestlers in Mexico. He made his TNA debut in an Ultimate X match at TNA's Victory Road show on July 13, 2008. During the World X tournament he defeated Kaz, Naruki Doi and Daivari to score four points for his team that allowed Team Mexico to win the tournament by one point. On October 30, 2008, Volador returned to TNA to work his first "Non-X-Cup" match, teaming up with Hiroshi Tanahashi as the two lost to The Motor City Machine Guns (Chris Sabin and Alex Shelley). On the edition of November 7 of TNA's weekly Impact! television show Volador teamed with Tanahashi to compete in a 4 team Ladder Match where the winning team would get a championship match against TNA World Tag Team Champions Beer Money, Inc. The match also included Team 3D, The Latin American Xchange and was won by Matt Morgan and Abyss. At TNA's 2008 Turning Point show, Volador participated in a 10-man X Division elimination rankings match. Volador was the second man eliminated from the match, which was won by Eric Young. The Turning Point match was Volador's last match for TNA.

New Japan Pro-Wrestling (2012–present)
On January 21 and 22, 2012, Volador Jr. took part in the CMLL and NJPW co-produced Fantastica Mania 2012 events in Tokyo. On the first night, Volador Jr. teamed with Kazuchika Okada to defeat the team of Hiroshi Tanahashi and La Sombra. In the main event of the second night, Volador Jr. unsuccessfully challenged La Sombra for the NWA World Historic Welterweight Championship.

In January 2013, Volador Jr. returned to Japan to take part in the three-day Fantastica Mania 2013 event. During the first night on January 18, he teamed with Taichi and Taka Michinoku to defeat La Máscara, Mascara Dorada and Máximo in a six-man tag team match. The following night, Volador Jr., Kazuchika Okada and Rey Escorpión defeated Hiroshi Tanahashi, La Máscara and Rush in another six-man tag team match. During the third and final night, Volador Jr. unsuccessfully challenged La Máscara for the Mexican National Light Heavyweight Championship.

In January 2014, Volador Jr. took part in the five-day Fantastica Mania 2014 tour. The third event of the tour, on January 17, was headlined by the first interaction between Volador Jr. and his longtime rival La Sombra, after the former's tecnico turn. The match, wrestled under Match Relampago VIP rules, ended in a ten-minute time limit draw. Two days later, in the final match of the tour, Volador Jr. successfully defended the NWA World Historic Welterweight Championship against Máscara Dorada.

In January 2015, Volador Jr. took part in the Fantastica Mania 2015 tour, during which he successfully defended the NWA World Historic Welterweight Championship against Gran Guerrero. In January 2016, Volador Jr. again returned to Japan to take part in Fantastica Mania 2016, successfully defending the NWA World Historic Welterweight Championship against Mephisto in the main event of the final show of the tour. The following May, Volador Jr. entered the Best of the Super Juniors XXIII tournament. After four wins and two losses, Volador Jr. headed to his final round-robin match leading his block, but was eliminated after losing to Will Ospreay. A year later, Volador Jr. was announced as a returning participant in the Best of the Super Juniors 24 tournament. He finished the tournament with a record of three wins and four losses, failing to advance to the finals.

On October 9, 2018, it was announced that Volador Jr. would be participating in NJPW's annual Super Junior Tag League. Teaming with Soberano Jr., he finished the tournament with a record of two wins and five losses, failing to advance to the finals. On October 8, 2019, it was announced that Volador Jr. would return to NJPW for the Super Junior Tag League. Teaming with Titán, he finished the tournament with a record of four wins and three losses, once again failing to advance to the finals.

Ring of Honor (2017)
Due to CMLL's partnership with Ring of Honor (ROH), Volador Jr. appeared at Supercard of Honor XI, where he teamed up with Will Ospreay to defeat Jay White and Dragon Lee.

Personal life
Ibarra is a part of an extended family of wrestlers, including his father Ramón Ibarra Banda who currently wrestles as Super Parka and previous wrestled as Volador, which is where Ibarra's ring name of Volador Jr. comes from. Volador Jr.'s uncles wrestle as Johnny Ibarra and El Desalmado, and he is the cousin of lucha libre legend L.A. Park and wrestler El Hijo de Cien Caras. He is also the great cousin of L.A. Park's son who wrestles as El Hijo de L.A. Park. Ibarra's nephew, a grandson of Ramón Ibarra Banda, began working for CMLL in 2014 under the ring name Flyer.

In 2013, Ibarra married CMLL Edecanes ("ring girl") Bruni Sagnite. The couple have a son together, born in 2014.

Championships and accomplishments
Consejo Mundial de Lucha Libre
CMLL World Tag Team Championship (3 times, current) – with La Sombra (1), Valiente (1) and Titán (1)
CMLL World Trios Championship (1 time) – with Místico and Valiente
Mexican National Light Heavyweight Championship (1 time)
Mexican National Trios Championship (4 times) – with Safari and El Felino (1), La Sombra and El Sagrado (1), Olímpico and Psicosis II (1), and Black Warrior and Mr. Águila (1)
NWA World Historic Middleweight Championship (1 time)
NWA World Historic Welterweight Championship (3 times, current)
Copa Homenaje A Dos Leyendas
Copa 53 Aniversario de la Arena Coliseo de Guadalajara (2012)
Copa Bicentenario
Copa Bobby Bonales
International Gran Prix (2016, 2019)
Torneo Gran Alternativa: 2016 – with Esfinge
Torneo Gran Alternativa: 2018 – with Flyer
Leyenda de Plata (2011, 2017)
Reyes del Aire (2005, 2007, 2009)
Torneo Nacional de Parejas Increibles (2013, 2017, 2021) – with La Sombra, Bárbaro Cavernario, Templario
Torneo Increibles de Parejas, Arena Puebla – with Atlantis
CMLL Universal Championship (2017)
CMLL Most Popular Wrestler of the Year (2009)
CMLL Tag Team of the Year (2009) – with La Sombra
Lucha Libre Azteca
LLA Azteca Championship (1 time)
Promociones El Cholo
Promociones El Cholo Cruiserweight Championship (1 time, current)
Pro Wrestling Illustrated
Ranked No. 81 of the top 500 singles wrestlers in the PWI 500 in 2010
Total Nonstop Action Wrestling
TNA World X Cup (2008) – with Rey Bucanero, Último Guerrero and Averno
Union Independent Pro Wrestling
 UIPW Heavyweight Championship (1 time)

Luchas de Apuestas record

Notes

References

External links

1981 births
Mexican male professional wrestlers
Living people
Masked wrestlers
Professional wrestlers from Coahuila
People from Monclova
20th-century professional wrestlers
21st-century professional wrestlers
Mexican National Trios Champions
CMLL World Tag Team Champions
NWA World Historic Middleweight Champions
NWA World Historic Welterweight Champions
Mexican National Light Heavyweight Champions